Ry Armstrong is an American actor and musician. They are known for their appearances in Uncut Gems, The Curious Incident of Everett Wilder, The Plot Against America, and The Gilded Age.

Biography
Armstrong was born in Kenmore, Washington. They attended Inglemoor High School for their early schooling. They took part in the Rising Star Project at 5th Avenue Theatre throughout their high school years.

Armstrong went to the Central Washington University for their undergraduate studies and graduated with a BFA in musical theater in 2016.

Armstrong became a member of Actors Equity after finishing their undergraduate studies. They have toured the country with TheatreWorks, performing in states such as Florida, Kansas, Michigan, and Vermont with a number of Off-Broadway productions.Crossroads, their debut album, was released in December 2017. They have also contributed vocals to the album The Shoe Bird, which was nominated for a Grammy Award.

In 2023, they stood as a candidate for District 3 in 2023.

 Personal life 
Armstrong identifies as genderqueer and is based in New York City.

Discography
AlbumsCrossroads (2017)

Filmography
 Uncut Gems (2019)
 The Curious Incident of Everett Wilder (2020)
 The Plot Against America (2020)
 The Gilded Age'' (2022)

References

External links

Living people
Actors from New York City
Actors from Washington (state)
People from King County, Washington
Central Washington University alumni
People with non-binary gender identities
American non-binary actors
Year of birth missing (living people)